Bombay is the soundtrack to the 1995 Indian film of the same name, with eight tracks composed by A. R. Rahman. The film was directed by Mani Ratnam, and stars Arvind Swamy and Manisha Koirala, while the soundtrack album was released in 1995 by Pyramid. The Indian film was originally a Tamil film dubbed into Hindi, Telugu and Malayalam. The soundtrack was thus released in multiple languages. The lyrics for the Tamil version were written by Vairamuthu, except for the song "Halla Gulla", which was written by Vaali. The lyrics for the Hindi and Telugu versions were written by Mehboob and Veturi, respectively.

The soundtrack of the film became one of the best-selling Indian music albums of all time, with sales of 15million units. The soundtrack was included in The Guardian'''s "1000 Albums to Hear Before You Die" list, and the Hindi version of the song "Kannalane", titled "Kehna Hi Kya" by K S Chitra was included in their "1000 Songs Everyone Must Hear" list. The song "Hamma" was later reused in Ok Jaanu (2017) as "The Humma Song". "Bombay Theme" has appeared in various international films and music compilations, while "Kannalanae" and "Bombay Theme" have been sampled by various international artists.

Release history
The soundtrack album was originally released in Tamil in December 1994. Soon after the original released, in 1995 it was also released in Hindi and in Telugu by Polygram MIL. PolyGram MIL later merged in Universal Music.

Critical reception
Since its release, the soundtrack for Bombay has been influential, both nationally and internationally. The soundtrack also found success across India in its dubbed Hindi and Telugu versions. In 2007, the soundtrack was included in The Guardians "1000 Albums to Hear Before You Die" list, and the Hindi version of the song "Kannalane", titled "Kehna Hi Kya", was included in their "1000 Songs Everyone Must Hear" list in 2009. In 2014, BBC Music listed Bombay among their "20 Greatest Soundtracks" of all time, and selected the instrumental "Bombay Theme" as its standout track.

A. R. Rahman won the Filmfare Best Music Director Award (Tamil) for the soundtrack. Vairamuthu won the Tamil Nadu State Film Award for Best Lyricist, and K. S. Chithra won the Tamil Nadu State Film Award for Best Female Playback for the song "Kannalane".

Songs
Kannalane
"Kannalane", also known as "Kehna Hi Kya", is based on Qawwali, a form of Islamic Sufi music. 
K. S. Chithra won the Tamil Nadu State Film Award for Best Female Playback for the song "Kannalane". Backing vocals were sung by A. R. Rahman, Sujatha Mohan, Ganga and Reshmi.

"Kehna Hi Kya", like the other songs on the Hindi soundtrack, was written by Urdu lyricist Mehboob. "Kehna Hi Kya" was included in The Guardians list of "1000 Songs Everyone Must Hear". The Hindi version of the song was also sampled by Ciara for her 2009 song "Turntables", featuring Chris Brown.

Bombay Theme

The track "Bombay Theme'" is an instrumental orchestral piece composed and arranged by A. R. Rahman. The track featured in various compilations and films besides being sampled by many major artists. Major compilation albums on which it appeared include Chakra Seven Centers (1995; in which it was credited as "Ajna Chakra"), Anokha - Soundz of the Asian Underground (1997), Café del Mar Vol 5 (1998), Ambient Chillout Mix Vol. 1 (2002) and Paradisiac 2 . The track is alternatively credited as "Bombay Theme Tune," "Mumbai Theme Tune" or "Bombay Theme Music" in compilations. It was featured in the Italian film Denti by Gabriele Salvatores in 2000, in the Palestinian film Divine Intervention in 2002, in the 2005 Hollywood film Lord of War, and in Julian Schnabel's Miral (2010). Rahman reused the track as "Bombay Theme Intro" in the score of the 1996 film, Fire'', by Deepa Mehta. It also appeared on a French TV commercial for Volvic starring Zinedine Zidane in 2000. The theme was also sampled by the German band Löwenherz for their song "Bis in die Ewigkeit", and by the American rapper Lloyd Banks for his song "Rather By Me" (2009).

Hamma

Uyire
The track "Uyire" was among the most popular and acclaimed songs of the 1990s. It was sung by Hariharan, who believes it is the best one he has ever sung. After composing the song, Rahman had three choices for the vocalist - S. P. Balasubrahmanyam, K. J. Yesudas and Hariharan. Rahman says: "I had three options for that song. SPB sir, Yesudas sir, Hariharan. Then I imagined all of them singing it. Since I had not heard Hari in a non-ghazal kind of song, I decided to take the gamble. Then when he did, he had a whole new flavour for the song." The song also incorporates elements of Sufi music.

The female vocals have been provided by K. S. Chithra for Tamil and Telugu, and the Hindi version was sung by Kavita Krishnamurthy. The song was called "Tu Hi Re" in Hindi while it was called "Urike Chilaka" in Telugu. The Hindi version was first sung by K.S.Chithra but music company wanted Hindi singer to sing henceforth it was sung by Kavita Krishnamurthy. The background voice was by Hariharan & Swarnalatha

The song was shooted at Bekal Fort in Kerala. Taj Bekal and Taj Lalit are situated near the Fort. The beutiful place in the world

Track listing
The Tamil track "Andha Arabic Kadaloram" had two different versions. The original release contained only A. R. Rahman's version; whereas the re-released version contained the rap portions by Remo Fernandes which were recorded for the Hindi dubbed version.

References

A. R. Rahman soundtracks
Tamil film soundtracks
1995 soundtrack albums
Hindi-language albums
Urdu-language albums
Hindi film soundtracks